3176 Paolicchi, provisional designation , is a carbonaceous asteroid from the outer region of the asteroid belt, about 34 kilometers in diameter. It was discovered on 13 November 1980, by Serbian astronomer Zoran Knežević at the Konkoly Observatory's Piszkéstető Station northeast of Budapest, Hungary.

Orbit and classification 

The dark C-type asteroid orbits the Sun in the outer main-belt at a distance of 2.8–3.0 AU once every 4 years and 11 months (1,781 days). Its orbit has an eccentricity of 0.03 and an inclination of 18° with respect to the ecliptic.

Physical characteristics 

It has a rotation period of 20.400 hours and an albedo in the range of 0.04–0.08, according to the surveys carried out by the Infrared Astronomical Satellite, IRAS, the Japanese Akari satellite, and the Wide-field Infrared Survey Explorer with its subsequent NEOWISE mission. The Collaborative Asteroid Lightcurve Link derives an albedo of 0.05. Estimated diameters for Paolicchi range between 31.8 and 41.3 kilometers.

Naming 

This minor planet was named in honor of Italian astrophysicist Paolo Paolicchi (b. 1950) at the University of Pisa, whose research activity included the study on the dynamical and collisional history of Small Solar System bodies and the origin of planetary and stellar systems. Paolicchi's work on minor planets has focused on the modeling of catastrophic breakup events and on the evolution of their rotational properties. The official naming citation was published by the Minor Planet Center on 7 September 1987.

References

External links 
 Paolo Paolicchi – Università di Pisa
 Asteroid Lightcurve Database (LCDB), query form (info )
 Dictionary of Minor Planet Names, Google books
 Asteroids and comets rotation curves, CdR – Observatoire de Genève, Raoul Behrend
 Discovery Circumstances: Numbered Minor Planets (1)-(5000) – Minor Planet Center
 
 

003176
Named minor planets
19801113